Shah Nal railway station (Urdu and ) is located in Shah Nal village, Lodhran district of Punjab province, Pakistan.

See also
 List of railway stations in Pakistan
 Pakistan Railways

References

External links

Railway stations in Lodhran District
Railway stations on Karachi–Peshawar Line (ML 1)